Consideration is a concept of English common law and is a necessity for simple contracts but not for special contracts (contracts by deed). The concept has been adopted by other common law jurisdictions.

The court in Currie v Misa declared consideration to be a “Right,  Interest,  Profit,  Benefit, or Forbearance,  Detriment,  Loss,  Responsibility”. Thus, consideration is a promise of something of value given by a promissor in exchange for something of value given by a promisee; and typically the thing of value is goods, money, or an act. Forbearance to act, such as an adult promising to refrain from smoking, is enforceable  if one is thereby surrendering a legal right.

Consideration may be thought of as the concept of value offered and accepted by people or organisations entering into contracts. Anything of value promised by one party to the other when making a contract can be treated as "consideration": for example, if A contracts to buy a car from B for $5,000, A's consideration is the promise of $5,000, and B's consideration is the promise of the car.

Additionally, if A signs a contract with B such that A will paint B's house for $500, A's consideration is the service of painting B's house, and B's consideration is $500 paid to A. Further if A signs a contract with B such that A will not repaint his own house in any other colour than white, and B will pay A $500 per year to keep this deal up, there is also a consideration. Although A did not promise to affirmatively do anything, A did promise not to do something that he was allowed to do, and so A did pass consideration. A's consideration to B is the forbearance in painting his own house in a colour other than white, and B's consideration to A is $500 per year. Conversely, if A signs a contract to buy a car from B for $0, B's consideration is still the car, but A is giving no consideration, and so there is no valid contract. However, if B still gives the title to the car to A, then B cannot take the car back, since, while it may not be a valid contract, it is a valid gift.

In common law it is a prerequisite that both parties offer consideration before a contract can be thought of as binding. The doctrine of consideration is irrelevant in many jurisdictions, although contemporary commercial litigant relations have held the relationship between a promise and a deed is a reflection of the nature of contractual considerations. If there is no element of consideration found, there is thus no contract formed.

However, even if a court decides there is no contract, there might be a possible recovery under the doctrines of quantum meruit (sometimes referred to as a quasi-contract) or promissory estoppel.

Legal rules regarding consideration
There are a number of common issues as to whether consideration exists in a contract. Under English law:
 Part payment is not good consideration.
 Consideration must move from the promisee but need not flow to the promisor.
 Consideration must be sufficient but need not be adequate.
 Consideration cannot be illusory.
 Consideration must not be past. Past consideration is not good consideration.
 Moral consideration is not sufficient (except for contracts by deed, where "love and affection" is often cited as the [unnecessary] consideration).
 Performance of existing duties is not good consideration.

Meanwhile, the Indian Contract Act, 1872 which continues in force in Pakistan, Bangladesh, and India (the most populous common law jurisdiction)  provides that valid consideration exists “when at the desire of the promisor, the promisee or any other person has done or abstained from doing, or does or abstains from doing, or promises to do or abstain from doing something" or, in other words, when each party receives something in return for entering into a contractual obligation. An agreement must be supported by a lawful consideration on both sides. Under the act, valid consideration must satisfy the following criteria:
It must move at the desire of the promisor.  An act constituting consideration must have been done at the desire or request of the promisor. If it is done at the instance of a third party or without the desire of the promisor, it will not be good consideration. For example, A saves B's goods from fire without being ask him to do so. A cannot demand payment for his service.
Consideration may move from the promisee or any other person. Under Indian law, consideration may be from the promisee of any other person i.e., even a stranger. This means that as long as there is consideration for the promisee, it is immaterial who has furnished it. 
Consideration must be an act, abstinence or forbearance or a returned promise. 
Consideration may be past, present or future. Past consideration is not consideration according to English law.  However it is a consideration as per Indian law. Example of past consideration is, A renders some service to B at latter's desire. After a month B promises to compensate A for service rendered to him earlier. When consideration is given simultaneously with promise, it is said to be present consideration .. For example, A receives Rs.50/- in return for which he promises to deliver certain goods to B. The money A receives is the present consideration. When consideration to one party to other is to pass subsequently to the maker of the contract, is said to be future consideration. For example. A promises to deliver certain goods to B after  a week. B promises to pay the price after a fortnight, such consideration is future. 
Consideration must be real. Consideration must be real, competent and having some value in the eyes of law. For example, A promises to restore life to B's dead wife, if B pays him Rs.1000/—. A's promise is physically impossible to perform, hence there is no real consideration. 
Consideration must be something which the promisor is not already bound to do. A promise to do something what one is already bound to do, either by law, is not a good consideration, since it adds nothing to the previous existing legal consideration.
Consideration need not be adequate. Consideration need not necessarily be equal in value to something given. So long as consideration exists, the courts are not concerned as to adequacy, provided it is for some value.
Additionally, under the Indian Contract Act 1872, any consideration is invalid if it is:
Forbidden by law
It involves injury to a person or property of another
Courts regards it as immoral
It is of such nature that, if permitted, it would defeat the provisions of any law 
It is fraudulent, or involves or implies injury to the person or property of another
It is contrary to public policy
The consideration conveyed by at least one side seeks to restrain legal proceedings
The consideration includes public offices or titles
The consideration involves involuntary labour or otherwise infringes upon the personal liberty of a party to the contract
The consideration includes a marriage or a pecuniary inducement to marry.
The most noticeable distinction between the English and Indian criteria for consideration is that English law prohibits past consideration while Indian law does not.

History and comparative law
Systems based on Roman law (including Germany and Scotland) do not require consideration, and some commentators consider it unnecessary and have suggested that the doctrine of consideration should be abandoned, and estoppel used to replace it as a basis for contracts. However, legislation, rather than judicial development, has been touted as the only way to remove this entrenched common law doctrine. Lord Justice Denning famously stated that "The doctrine of consideration is too firmly fixed to be overthrown by a side-wind".

The reason that both exist in common law jurisdictions is thought by leading scholars to be the result of the combining by 19th-century judges of two distinct threads: first the consideration requirement was at the heart of the action of assumpsit, which had grown up in medieval times and remained the normal action for breach of a simple contract in England and Wales until 1884 when the old forms of action were abolished; secondly, the notion of agreement between two or more parties as being the essential legal and moral foundation of contract in all legal systems, was promoted by the 18th-century French writer Pothier in his Traite des Obligations, much read (especially after translation into English in 1805) by English judges and jurists. The latter chimed well with the fashionable will theories of the time, especially John Stuart Mill's influential ideas on free will, and got grafted on to the traditional common law requirement for consideration to ground an action in assumpsit.

Civil law systems take the approach that an exchange of promises, or a concurrence of wills alone, rather than an exchange in valuable rights is the correct basis. So if A promises to give B a book and B accepts the offer without giving anything in return, B would have a legal right to the book and A could not change her mind about giving it to B as a gift. However, in common law systems the concept of culpa in contrahendo, a form of estoppel, is increasingly used to create obligations during pre-contractual negotiations. Estoppel is an equitable doctrine that provides for the creation of legal obligations if a party has given another an assurance and the other has relied on the assurance to his detriment.

Monetary value of consideration
Generally, courts do not inquire whether the deal between two parties was monetarily fair—merely that each party passed some legal obligation or duty to the other party. The dispositive issue is the presence of consideration, not the adequacy of the consideration. The values between consideration passed by each party to a contract need not be comparable.

For instance, if A offers B $200 to buy B's mansion, luxury sports car, and private jet, there is still consideration on both sides. A's consideration is $200, and B's consideration is the mansion, car, and jet. Courts in the United States generally leave parties to their own contracts and do not intervene. The old English rule of consideration questioned whether a party gave the value of a peppercorn to the other party. As a result, contracts in the United States have sometimes have had one party pass nominal amounts of consideration, typically citing $1. Thus, licensing contracts that do not involve any money at all often cite as consideration, "for the sum of $1 and other good and valuable consideration."

However, some courts in the United States may take issue with nominal consideration, or consideration with virtually no value. Some courts have since thought this was a sham. Since contract disputes are typically resolved in state court, some state courts have found that merely providing $1 to another is not a sufficiently legal duty, and therefore no legal consideration passes in these kinds of deals, and consequently, no contract is formed. However, this is a minority position.

Pre-existing legal duties

A party that already has a legal duty to provide money, an object, a service, or a forbearance, does not provide consideration when promising merely to uphold that duty. That legal duty can arise from law, or obligation under a previous contract.

The prime example of this sub-issue is where an uncle gives his thirteen-year-old nephew (a resident of the state of New York) the following offer: "if you do not smoke cigarettes or drink alcohol until your 18th birthday, then I will pay you $5,000". On the nephew's 18th birthday, he tells the uncle to pay up, and the uncle does not pay.  In the subsequent lawsuit, the uncle wins, because the nephew, by U.S. criminal law, already had a duty to refrain from smoking cigarettes while under 18 and from drinking alcohol while under age 21.

The same applies if the consideration is a performance for which the parties had previously contracted. For example, A agrees to paint B's house for $500, but halfway through the job A tells B that he will not finish unless B increases the payment to $750. If B agrees, and A then finishes the job, B still only needs to pay A the $500 originally agreed to, because A was already contractually obligated to paint the house for that amount.

An exception to this rule holds for settlements, such as an accord and satisfaction.  If a creditor has a credit against a debtor for $10,000, and offers to settle it for $5,000, it is still binding, if accepted, even though the debtor had a legal duty to repay the entire $10,000.

Pre-existing duties relating to at-will employment depend largely on state law.  Generally, at-will employment allows the employer to terminate the employee for good or even no reason (as long as the reason, if any, is not explicitly illegal), and allows the employee to resign for any reason.  There are no duties of continued employment in the future.  Therefore, when an employee demands a raise, there is no issue with consideration because the employee has no legal duty to continue working.  Similarly, when an employer demands a pay-cut, there is also no contractual issue with consideration, because the employer has no legal duty to continue employing the worker.  However, certain states require additional consideration other than the prospect of continued employment, to enforce terms demanded later by the employer, in particular, non-competition clauses.

Bundled terms
Contracts where a legally valueless term is bundled with a term that does have legal value are still generally enforceable.

Consider the uncle's situation above. If the same uncle had instead told his 13-year-old nephew the following offer: "if you do not smoke cigarettes, do not drink alcohol, swear or play cards for money (gamble) before your 21st birthday, then I will pay you $5,000".  On the nephew's 21st birthday, he asks the uncle to pay up, and this time, in the subsequent lawsuit, the nephew may win. Although the promise of not drinking alcohol and gambling while under the age of 21 was not valuable consideration (it was already legally prohibited), most states allow smoking by age 18 and swearing is not illegal at any age.  Even though smoking is legally restricted until age 18, it is legal for those above 18, and thus the promise to forbear from it entirely has legal value.  However, the uncle would still be relieved from the liability if his nephew drank alcohol, even though that consideration is valueless, because it was paired with something of legal value; therefore, adherence to the entire, collective agreement is necessary.

Past consideration
Generally, past consideration is not a valid consideration and has no legal value. Past consideration is consideration that has already flowed from the promisee to the promisor. That is, the promisee's act or forbearance predates the promisor's promise. Past consideration therefore cannot be used as a basis when claiming damages.

An exception to this rule is where there is a duty owed to a third party. 	An act done before the giving of a promise to make a payment or to confer some other benefit can sometimes be consideration for the promise. For this to hold, three conditions must be satisfied (Pao On v Lau Yiu Long [1980]):

 The act must have been done at the promisor’s request
 The parties must have understood the act was to be remunerated either by a payment or the conferment of some other benefit 
 Payment/conferment of the benefit must have been legally enforceable had it been promised in advance

Option contracts and conditional consideration
Generally, conditional consideration is valid consideration.

Suppose A is a movie script writer and B runs a movie production company.  A says to B, "buy my script." B says "How about this – I will pay you $5,000 so that you do not let anyone else produce your movie until one year from now.  If I do produce your movie in that year, then I will give you another $50,000, and no one else can produce it.  If I do not produce your movie in that year, then you're free to go."  If the two subsequently get into a dispute, the issue of whether a contract exists is answered.  B had an option contract—he could decide to produce the script, or not. B's consideration passed was the $5,000 down, and the possibility of $50,000.  A's consideration passed was the exclusive rights to the movie script for at least one year.

In settlements

Suppose B commits a tort against A, causing $5,000 in compensatory damages and $3,000 in punitive damages.  Since there is no guarantee that A would win against B if it went to court, A may agree to drop the case if B pays the $5,000 compensatory damages.  This is sufficient consideration, since B's consideration is a guaranteed recovery, and A's consideration is that B only has to pay $5,000, instead of $8,000.

Criticism

The primary criticism of the doctrine of consideration is that, in its present form, it is purely a formality that merely serves to complicate commerce and create legal uncertainty by opening up otherwise simple contracts to scrutiny as to whether the consideration purportedly tendered satisfies the requirements of the law. While the purpose of the doctrine was ostensibly to protect parties seeking to void oppressive contracts, this is currently accomplished through the use of a sophisticated variety of defences available to the party seeking to void a contract. In practice, the doctrine of consideration has resulted in a phenomenon similar to that of Ḥiyal in Islamic contracts, whereby parties to a contract use technicalities to satisfy requirements while in actual fact circumventing them in practice. Typically, this is often described in the form of "peppercorn" consideration, i.e. consideration that is trivial but still satisfies the requirements of law, although texts and commentators making such assertions do have a credible basis for doing so.

The doctrine of consideration is expressly rejected by the UNIDROIT Principles of International Commercial Contracts on the grounds that it yields uncertainty and unnecessary litigation, thereby hindering international trade. Similarly, the United Nations Convention on Contracts for the International Sale of Goods similarly does not require consideration for a contract to be valid, thereby excluding the doctrine with regard to contracts covered by the convention even in common law jurisdictions where it would otherwise apply. Consequently, the continued existence of the doctrine in common law jurisdictions is controversial. Scots lawyer Harvey McGregor's "Contract Code", a Law Commission-sponsored proposal to both unite and codify English and Scots Law, proposed the abolition of consideration.  Some commentators have suggested that consideration be replaced by estoppel as a basis for contracts. However, any change to the doctrine of consideration in the jurisdictions in which it exists would need to implemented by legislation

See also

Consideration under English law
Consideration under American law
 Consideration is not required for a contract under Scots contract law

Notes

References

Contract law
Legal doctrines and principles